Club Sporting Canamy is a Mexican football club that plays in the Liga Premier after their objective to promote from the Tercera División de México was a success in the 2014–15 season finished as runner-up. The club is based in Oaxtepec, Morelos after a relocation from Mexico City after 2016–17 season.

History
On May 30, 2015, Sporting Canamy will be promoted to Segunda División de México for the first time in their history to Liga Premier (Winner) or Liga Nuevo Talentos (Runner-up) and also, advance to their first final app. in history, too. But a week later, they promoted to Liga Nuevo Talentos (Runner-up) after losing to Uruapan. However, both teams were partipicated in the Liga Nuevo Talentos after Uruapan were promoted to Liga Premier, but stadium requirements were not clear and they have a year to fix the solution.

On April 23, 2016, after a winning series against Sahuayo F.C. in the semifinals of Liga Nuevo Talentos Clausura 2016 plus winning the quarterfinals against San Luis B, Sporting Canamy advanced to their first final in their rookie season in the Liga Nuevo Talentos after less than a year when they were promoted from the Tercera Division. Sporting Canamy was defeated in the final against Real Zamora.

However, in July 2016, the club was invited to participate at Liga Premier de Ascenso as an expansion team. In May 2017, Sporting Canamy moved from Mexico City to Oaxtepec.

After their arrival in Serie A, Sporting Canamy maintained a reserve team in the Third Division, this squad had won the championship of the category in the 2016–17 season, however, it was later stripped of the title after a complaint filed by Tecos F.C., which argued the use of players older than the age allowed by the regulation.

In August 2020 the team went into hiatus due to financial problems derived from COVID-19, however, a month later an agreement was signed with Halcones Zúñiga, a team of the Liga TDP, to participate in that league during the 2020–21 season, using the Halcones license, but with the Canamy operation and colors. In 2021 the team was reactivated in Liga Premier and will participate in the 2021–22 season.

Players

Current squad

Competitive record

2019-20 season was suspended on March 16, 2020; ended the season completely on May 22 due to COVID-19.

See also
Football in Mexico
Real Canamy Tlayacapan

Notes

Club honors
Liga Premier de México: 0
Runner-up (1): Clausura 2016

Tercera División de México: 0
Runner-up (1): 2015–16

External links
Official page

References

Football clubs in Morelos
Association football clubs established in 2008
2008 establishments in Mexico
Liga Premier de México